Freebirds may refer to:
The Fabulous Freebirds, a professional wrestling stable
 Free Birds, a 2013 American 3D computer-animated buddy comedy film

See also
Free Bird, a song by the American southern rock band Lynyrd Skynyrd